Juha Koivisto (born 4 May 1984) is a Finnish professional ice hockey player. He is currently playing for Dragons de Rouen of the French Ligue Magnus.

Koivisto made his Liiga debut playing with SaiPa during the 2010–11 SM-liiga season.

References

External links

1984 births
Living people
Dragons de Rouen players
Finnish ice hockey forwards
HPK players
Mikkelin Jukurit players
Kiekko-Vantaa players
Oulun Kärpät players
Sportspeople from Vantaa
SaiPa players
Sheffield Steelers players
Vaasan Sport players